Kòu (寇) is a Chinese surname. It originates as a title denoting status as a police officer, and is a shortened for of Sikou (司寇). A 2013 study found it was the 240th most common surname, shared by 380,000 people or 0.029% of the population, with the province with the most people being Henan.

Kou may refer to:

People with Ko/Kou/Kow as the given name
Kou Abhay (1892–1964), Prime Minister of the Kingdom of Laos
, Japanese former football player
, Japanese manga artist
, Japanese footballer
, Japanese manga artist
Kou Luogon (born 1984), Liberian athlete
, Japanese author, punk rock singer, poet and actor
, Japanese music composer
, Japanese actress and singer
Kou Voravong (1914–1954), Laotian politician
, Japanese manga artist

People with Kou as the surname
Kou Roun, Cambodian minister for national security
Johanna Kou (born 1975), New Caledonian badminton player
Kou Nai-han (born 1982), Taiwanese volleyball player 
, Japanese footballer
Kou Lei (Коу Лей, born 1987), Ukrainian table tennis player of Chinese origin
Kou Qianzhi (寇謙之, 365–448), Taoist reformer
Kou Tie (寇铁, born 1950), Chinese major general
Kou Yingjie (寇英杰, 1880?-?), Chinese military leader
Kou Zhun (寇準, 961–1023), chancellor during Emperor Zhenzong's reign
Kou Zhichao (born 1989), Chinese volleyball player

Fictional characters
, a character from Terra Formars
, a character from Diabolik Lovers
, a character from Ajin: Demi-Human
, a character from Wangan Midnight
Sailor Stars from Sailor Moon
, Named Sailor Star Fighter
, Named Sailor Star Maker
, Named Sailor Star Healer
, a character from Mobile Suit Gundam 0083: Stardust Memory
, a character from Toilet-Bound Hanako-kun
, a character from Ao Haru Ride

See also
Kou (disambiguation)
Kou Zhu, fictional Song dynasty palace maid

References

Japanese feminine given names
Japanese unisex given names
Japanese masculine given names